Echiostoma barbatum, the Threadfin dragonfish, is a species of barbeled dragonfish and is the only known species in its genus. This species grows to a length of  SL.

Like many fish that live in the Mesopelagic zone the threadfin dragonfish uses bioluminescent organs to attract prey.

References

 

Stomiidae
Taxa named by Richard Thomas Lowe
Fish described in 1843